The Ministry of Interior of  Morocco is a department of the Government of Morocco in charge of the country's interior affairs.

Headquarters in Rabat

The headquarters of the ministry in Rabat is the former seat of the Resident-general in the French protectorate in Morocco. It is located on a prominent position to the south of the walled city of Rabat, east of the Dar al-Makhzen royal palace. Hubert Lyautey, the first Resident-General, chose this hilltop site for his residence, overlooking the ancient site of Chellah which lies immediately to its south. The complex was designed from 1916 by French architect Albert Laprade, who resided in Morocco from 1917 to 1919, and completed in 1924.

See also
 Government of Morocco
 Embassy of France, Tunis, former seat of France's Resident-general in the French protectorate of Tunisia

Notes

Interior
Morocco
Government of Morocco